Ran Nir is a Berlin-based Israeli indie folk and rock singer-songwriter and multi-instrumentalist & music producer. He was a founding member of the Israeli group Asaf Avidan and the Mojos from 2006 to 2011 and LNFT from 2012 to 2018. He released his debut solo studio album "Obsession" in 2019, and his 2nd album "Greener Pastures" in 2022 with Hamburg based label "Clouds Hill".

Career

2006–2011: Asaf Avidan and the Mojos
Ran Nir together with Asaf Avidan cofounded the band Asaf Avidan and the Mojos in 2006. He wrote and coproduced music as well as played bass for the band. The band released three studio albums The Reckoning, Poor Boy / Lucky Man and Through the Gale with The Reckoning getting certified Gold and Platinum in Israel. The Reckoning title single became a big success and its remix by German DJ Wankelmut reached No. 1 in more than ten countries. The band also received nominations including MTV Europe Music Award for Best Israeli Act in 2009, Echo Award for Song of the Year 2014, World Music Awards for World's Best Video and World's Best Song for One Day/Reckoning Song both in 2014. The band ceased operation in 2011.

2011: The Wrong Demons
During 2011, the final year of work with Asaf Avidan & The Mojos, Nir together with drummer Yoni Sheleg and guitarist Roi Peled (ex Asaf Avidan & The Mojos) released a digital EP called "In/Between" under the band name "The Wrong Demons", where Nir was one of the two lead singers, co-producer, composer, lyricist, bass-player & arranger.

2012–2018: LNFT
After the cessation of Asaf Avidan and the Mojos, Ran Nir started a new rock band called LNFT (Elephant – Live Free Not Troubled) in 2012. The band released their debut album "Tales Of a Drunken Man" that same year and it was named one of the best rock albums in Israel that year. Ran Nir moved to Berlin, Germany in 2014 as he worked on their second album "Time To Bleed", recorded in both Israel & Germany by Ran Nir & Fabien Leseure. The album was released in Israel in 2014 with Nana Disc and later for the rest of the world in 2015 with Cargo Records.

2014-2022: I Am You Music Group (IMU Records)
In 2014, Ran Nir together with Andrew Campbell, started a music management company, publishing, booking & record label (IMU Records) under the name I Am You Music Group in Germany. The record label has released music by musicians like Totemo, ORI, Dan Billu, Sivan Talmor, Bucharest, InAbell, Trace Kotik and Nir's debut album "Obsession". After the COVID 19 Pandemic the two decided to close the company and pursue different paths.

2019: Obsession (Debut Solo album)
Ran Nir released his solo ten track studio album "Obsession" in 2019. The album was recorded and produced by Nir and co-producer Erez Frank in Berlin, Germany. The album's title song and single "Obsession" was released with an animated video by Yonatan Ber prior to the album's release.

The album received great reviews and the title track "Obsession" was used in the soundtrack of the film "Ein Nasser Hund", by director Damir Lukačević.

2022: Greener Pastures (2nd Solo album) 
Ran Nir released his solo ten track studio album "Greener Pastures" in 2022. The album was recorded and produced by Nir and co-producer Erez Frank in Berlin, Germany. 

The album was released via the Hamburg based label "Clouds Hill".

Personal life
Ran Nir was born in Jerusalem, Israel. He moved to Berlin, Germany in 2014. He is married to writer My Amelie Roman Fagerlind, the two have one child.

Discography

Asaf Avidan and the Mojos

Studio albums

Singles

LFNT

Albums

Studio albums

Ran Nir (Solo)

Albums
Studio albums

References

External links
 IMU Records

Israeli musicians
Living people
1984 births
Israeli singer-songwriters